During the 2004–05 season, Red Star Belgrade participated in the 2004–05 First League of Serbia and Montenegro, 2004–05 Serbia and Montenegro Cup, 2004–05 UEFA Champions League qualifying rounds and 2004–05 UEFA Cup.

International Football Tournament in Leipzig (IFiZ)

Squad

Results

Overview

First League of Serbia and Montenegro

Serbia and Montenegro Cup

UEFA Champions League

Second qualifying round

Third qualifying round

UEFA Cup

First round

See also
 List of Red Star Belgrade seasons

References

Red Star Belgrade seasons
Red Star